Benedict the Moor  (1526 – 4 April 1589) was a Sicilian Franciscan friar who is venerated as a saint in the Catholic church. Born of enslaved Africans in San Fratello, he was freed at birth and became known for his charity. As a young man he joined a Franciscan-affiliated hermit group, of which he became the leader. In 1564 he was sent to the Franciscan friary in Palermo, where he continued good works.

Life
Benedict was born to Cristoforo and Diana Manasseri, Africans who were taken as slaves in the early 16th century to San Fratello (also known as San Fradello or San Philadelphio), a small town near Messina, Sicily. They were given Italian names and later converted to Christianity. The Italian "il Moro" for "the dark-skinned" has been interpreted as referring to Moorish heritage. Because of his appearance, Benedict was also called Æthiops or Niger (both referring to black skin color and not the modern-day countries).

Benedict's parents were granted freedom for their son before his birth because of their "loyal service". Like most peasants, Benedict did not attend any school and was illiterate. During his youth, he worked as a shepherd and was quick to give what he had earned to the poor. When he was 21 years old, he was publicly insulted for his color. His forbearance at this time was noted by the leader of an independent group of hermits on nearby Monte Pellegrino, who followed the Rule for hermit life written by Francis of Assisi. Benedict was quickly invited to join that community, and shortly thereafter he gave up all his earthly possessions and joined them. He served as the cook for the community and at the age of twenty-eight succeeded Jerome Lanze as leader of the group.

In 1564 Pope Pius IV disbanded independent communities of hermits, ordering them to attach themselves to an established religious Order, in this case, the Order of Friars Minor. Once a friar of the Order, Benedict was assigned to Palermo to the Franciscan Friary of St. Mary of Jesus. He started at the friary as a cook, but, showing the degree of his advancement in the spiritual life, he was soon appointed as the master of novices, and later as Guardian of the community, although he was a lay brother rather than a priest, and was illiterate.

Benedict accepted the promotion, and successfully helped the order adopt a stricter version of the Franciscan Rule of life. He was widely respected for his deep, intuitive understanding of theology and Scripture, and was often sought for counseling. He also had a reputation as a healer of the sick. Combined, these characteristics continued to draw many visitors to him. As he enjoyed cooking, he returned to kitchen duty in his later years.

Benedict died at the age of 65 and, it is claimed, on the very day and hour which he had predicted. At the entrance of his cell in the Franciscan friary of St. Mary of Jesus, there is a plaque with the inscription: "This is the cell where Saint Benedict lived", and the dates of his birth and death – 1524 and 1589. Other sources list the year of his birth as 1526. In a New York Times review of the 2012 exhibit, Revealing the African Presence in Renaissance Europe, at the Walters Art Gallery in Baltimore, Maryland, his birth date is given as 1526.

Upon his death, King Philip III of Spain ordered the construction of a magnificent tomb to house his remains in the friary church.

Veneration
Benedict was beatified by Pope Benedict XIV in 1743 and canonized in 1807 by Pope Pius VII. It is claimed that his body was found incorrupt upon exhumation a few years later.

Benedict is remembered for his patience and understanding when confronted with racial prejudice and taunts. He was declared a patron saint of African Americans, along with the Dominican lay brother, Martin de Porres. In the United States, at least seven historically Black Catholic parishes bear his name, including but not limited to the following cities: 

Washington, DC; New York City; Chicago (St. Benedict the African); Pittsburgh, Pennsylvania; North Omaha, Nebraska; Winston-Salem, North Carolina; Dayton, Ohio; and, Milwaukee, Wisconsin. Capuchin friars of Milwaukee's serve a meal for the homeless six days a week as part of a ministry to reach out to transient, disenfranchised and isolated people. Grambling, Louisiana also has a parish under his patronage, called St. Benedict the Black.

The latest church in the United States to be placed under his patronage is the one in Dayton, established in 2003 under the leadership of Fr Francis Tandoh, a priest from Ghana. The parish maintains a ministry to natives of that country, as well as parishioners from two previous parishes merged to form it.

St. Benedict the Moor Catholic Church, established in 1874 and located in the Historical District of Savannah, Georgia, is the oldest Catholic Church for African Americans in Georgia and one of the oldest in the Southeastern United States. Churches named for him have been founded in Columbus, Georgia and St. Augustine, Florida.

Veneration of Benedict is spread throughout Latin America, from Mexico through Argentina. In Venezuela, particularly, his devotion is spread through the country's various states, and he is celebrated on many different dates, according to the local traditions.

Gallery

See also
List of Catholic saints
 Incorruptibility

References

Further reading
Attwater, Donald and Catherine Rachel John. The Penguin Dictionary of Saints. 3rd edition. New York: Penguin Books, 1993. .
St Benedict the Moor Church in Dayton, Ohio. On February 2, 2003, the parish community of St. James/Resurrection broke ground on eleven acres of property at the corner of Liscum Drive and McLin Parkway (State Route 35).  St. Benedict the Moor celebrated on May 14, 2005, the opening of their church and the "homecoming" of a faith journey that started many years ago .

External links
StBenedicttheMoor.org
Saints.SQPN.com: St Benedict Biography
Anja's Art: St. Benedict Wood Sculpture

1526 births
1589 deaths
People from San Fratello
Italian hermits
Italian Friars Minor
Burials in Sicily
Sicilian saints
Canonized Roman Catholic religious brothers
People celebrated in the Lutheran liturgical calendar
16th-century Christian saints
Franciscan saints
Incorrupt saints
Canonizations by Pope Pius VII
Religious leaders from the Province of Messina
African diaspora in Italy
African-American Roman Catholicism
Beatifications by Pope Benedict XIV